Ukranenland is an archeological village-museum in Torgelow in north-east Germany. The name comes from an old Slavic tribe, the Ukri (Ukrani).

Gallery

See also 
 Uckermark
 Ukrani

External links 
 Ukranenland

Museums in Mecklenburg-Western Pomerania
Open-air museums in Germany